The Battle of Port Moresby was an aerial battle fought between the Royal Australian Air Force (RAAF) and United States Army Air Force (USAAF) on one side and the Imperial Japanese Army and Imperial Japanese Navy on the other between 3 February 1942 and 17 August 1943 over Port Moresby, Papua. At the start, the defenders consisted only of Australian Army anti-aircraft batteries and machine-guns, but by late March had been strengthened by the arrival of Kittyhawk fighters from No. 75 Squadron RAAF. However, in just nine days they lost 11 aircraft and only the arrival of replacements enabled the unit to maintain ten serviceable machines.

According to the Australian government:

On 31 March, the Australians were joined by the American 8th Bombardment Squadron with A-24 bombers and for two weeks in May by six P-39 Airacobras of the American 36th Pursuit Squadron. Despite the American assistance, the daily air battles over and around Port Moresby by 1 May had reduced No. 75 Squadron RAAF to just three airworthy machines. The American 35th, and the full 36th, Pursuit Squadrons arrived to relieve the Australian squadron. During their time in Port Moresby 75 Squadron had lost 21 aircraft and 12 pilots.

The Battle of the Coral Sea, which was fought mostly in the waters south-east of Papua in early May, diverted a Japanese naval attack against Port Moresby and removed the immediate threat. However, by May 1942 the Japanese had established themselves in the arc of islands north and east of the island of New Guinea as well as in the region around Lae and Madang on the north coast of the mainland.

References 

Defense of Port Moresby
Pathfinder Issue 103 January 2009 Retrieved on 20 June 2009.
Chapter 3: Japanese Air Operations over New Guinea Retrieved on 20 June 2009.

Conflicts in 1942
1942 in Papua New Guinea
1942 in aviation
World War II aerial operations and battles of the Pacific theatre
Port Moresby
Port Moresby
Port Moresby
Battles and operations of World War II involving Papua New Guinea